Hamilton Township is located in Lee County, Illinois. As of the 2010 census, its population was 205 and it contained 82 housing units. Three townships were formed from Hamilton Township. First Marion Township and May Township were formed in September, 1854, and then East Grove Township was formed on November 9, 1864.

Geography

Demographics

References

External links 
US Census
City-data.com
Cook County Official Site
Illinois State Archives

Townships in Lee County, Illinois
1849 establishments in Illinois
Townships in Illinois